{{DISPLAYTITLE:C4H11N}}
The molecular formula C4H11N may refer to:

n-Butylamine
sec-Butylamine
tert-Butylamine
Diethylamine
 N,N-Dimethylethylamine
Isobutylamine